Reba Kirson Monness was a female United States international table tennis player. 

She won a bronze medal at the 1947 World Table Tennis Championships in the women's team and a silver medal in the women's doubles with Mae Clouther.

She competed in the 1950 Maccabiah Games in Israel.

She was inducted into the USA Table Tennis Hall of Fame in 1981.

See also
 List of table tennis players
 List of World Table Tennis Championships medalists

References

American female table tennis players
1980 deaths
World Table Tennis Championships medalists
Competitors at the 1950 Maccabiah Games
Maccabiah Games competitors for the United States
Maccabiah Games bronze medalists for the United States
Maccabiah Games table tennis players
20th-century American women